Neverworld's End is the fifth studio album by German symphonic metal band Xandria. The record was released by Napalm Records on February 24, 2012. It is the only album to feature Manuela Kraller on vocals, and the last album to feature Nils Middelhauve on bass. The album produced one single, "Valentine".

Track listing

Charts

Personnel
All information from the album booklet.

Xandria
 Manuela Kraller – vocals
 Marco Heubaum – rhythm guitar, keyboards
 Philip Restemeier – lead guitar
 Nils Middelhauve – bass
 Gerit Lamm – drums

Additional musicians
 Joost van den Broek – keyboards, programming, orchestrations, sound design
 Ben Mathot – violin
 McAlbi – tin whistle, low whistle
 Johannes Schiefner – uillean pipes

Choir
 Fredrik Forsblad, Norbert Swoboda, Anselm Soos, Mani Müller, Klaus Ackermann, Mani Gruber, Marc Zillmann

Production
 Marco Heubaum – production
 Corni Bartels – engineering, vocal co-production
 Jörg Umbreit – mixing, mastering, engineering
 Stefan Heilemann – artwork, photography, layout, cover art

References

External links
 Album reviews on metal-archives.com
 Official discography on xandria.de

2012 albums
Xandria albums
Napalm Records albums